The men's 3000 metres steeplechase at the 2007 All-Africa Games were held on July 18.

Results

References
Results

3000